Someswarapuram is a village in the Papanasam taluk of Thanjavur district in the Indian state of Tamil Nadu.

Demographics 
Tamil is the local language spoken here.

Location 
It is located at the border of Thanjavur District, Tiruvarur district and Ariyalur district and 311 km away from Chennai. Thanjavur Junction railway station is the nearest major railway station to Someswarapuram.

References 

Villages in Thanjavur district